

The Ellehammer Semi-biplane was a pioneering aircraft flown in Denmark in 1906. Jacob Ellehammer built the aircraft based on his monoplane design of the previous year. Like that aircraft, it featured a large, triangular wing, with a motor (of Ellehammer's own design and construction) mounted beneath it. The pilot sat on a seat that was suspended like a pendulum, allowing him to shift his weight to control the aircraft, similar in concept (if not execution) to the control of a modern hang-glider. Unlike his monoplane, however, the semi-biplane's main wing formed a constant, unbroken span. Additionally, it was fitted with an upper wing of the same triangular shape, which connected to the main wing at its three corners and to an arch above the aircraft's centreline.

This was not a free flight, however, as the aircraft was tethered to a pole at the center of the runway. A replica of the aircraft was constructed in 1966 by Arvid Ligaard Sørensen, powered by a Citroën 2CV engine and donated to the Danmarks Flymuseum. Tests with the replica showed difficulties in transmitting engine power to the propeller and while this aircraft could taxi, it proved impossible to coax from the ground.

Specifications (variant)

References

 
 Danmarks Flymuseum - Ellehammer 1906 (replika)  (In Danish)

1900s Danish experimental aircraft
Semi-biplane
Single-engined tractor aircraft
Biplanes
Aircraft first flown in 1906